T. Madiyal (Thimmappaiah  Madiyal) was a former Director-General and Inspector-General of Police of State of Karnataka, India.

Childhood and Education

Madiyal hails from Alike village in Bantwal taluk near Mangalore and did his graduation in St Philomena's College in Mysore. He is a Havyaka Brahmin. He was Dg & IGP

Service and afterwards

He joined the army as a commissioned officer in 1964. He took part in the Indo-Pak war in 1965 and later joined the elite Indian Police Service (IPS) in 1971.

He began his career as assistant superintendent of police in Yadgir sub-division, Gulbarga district. He later worked as SP of Bellary, Belgaum and Mysore districts.

He had an eight-year stint in the Special Protection Group, New Delhi, serving Rajiv Gandhi and his family between 1983 and 1991 in the aftermath of Indira Gandhi's assassination.

As an IGP, he had served KSRP and other departments. He was also worked as an Intelligence Chief of State of Karnataka. He later served as ADGP (Law & Order) and Bangalore City Police Commissioner. On promotion as DGP, he was posted to head the Corps of Detectives (CoD) in November 2001.

He retired from the post of The Director-General and Inspector-General of Police of the State of Karnataka in June 2004.

After retirement, he served as an Administrator of Shree Ramachandrapura Math headed by Shree Raghaveshwara Bharathi Swamiji and served voluntarily for several years.

In Dec 2012, he joined an informal group of eminent persons as an "apolitical struggle to strengthen democracy".

References 

Indian police chiefs
Mangaloreans
Living people
People from Yadgir district
Year of birth missing (living people)
Karnataka Police
Indian Police Service officers